Bily may refer to:

Laurence Bily, French sprinter
Sydir Bily, Ukrainian Cossack
Bilyi, a different transliteration of the same Ukrainian surname

Bílý (feminine Bílá) is a Czech surname meaning "white". It may refer to:

Josef Bílý, Czech general
Lucie Bílá, Czech singer
Věra Bílá, Czech singer

See also

Bila (disambiguation)

Czech-language surnames
Ukrainian-language surnames